"Mein Anker" is a song performed by Austrian singer-songwriter and radio presenter Julian Le Play. The song was released as a digital download on 31 January 2014 as the second single from his second studio album Melodrom (2014). The song has peaked to number 6 on the Austrian Singles Chart.

Music video
A music video to accompany the release of "Mein Anker" was first released onto YouTube on 31 January 2014 at a total length of four minutes and twenty-seven seconds.

Track listing

Chart performance

Release history

References

2014 songs
2014 singles
Julian Le Play songs